Okinsky District (Akhyn aimag) is an administrative and municipal district (raion), one of the twenty-one in the Republic of Buryatia, Russia. It is located in the west of the republic. Its administrative center is the rural locality (a selo) of Orlik. As of the 2010 Census, the total population of the district was 5,353, with the population of Orlik accounting for 47.7% of that number.

History
The district was established on May 26, 1940.

Administrative and municipal status
Within the framework of administrative divisions, Okinsky District is one of the twenty-one in the Republic of Buryatia. The district is divided into one selsoviet and three somons, which comprise fifteen rural localities. As a municipal division, the district is incorporated as Okinsky Municipal District. Its one selsoviet and three somons are incorporated as four rural settlements within the municipal district. The selo of Orlik serves as the administrative center of both the administrative and municipal district.

References

Notes

Sources

Districts of Buryatia
States and territories established in 1940
 
